Azimuth recording is the use of a variation in angle between two recording heads that are recording data so close together on magnetic tape that crosstalk would otherwise likely occur. Normally, the head is perpendicular to the movement of the tape, and this is considered zero degrees. However, if the heads are mounted at slightly different angles (such as ±7 degrees in VHS), destructive interference will occur at high frequencies when reading data recorded in the cross-talking channel but not in the channel that is intended to be read. At low frequencies relative to the maximum allowed by the head gap, however, this technique is ineffective.  Thus one head is slanted slightly leftwards and the magnetic gap of the other head slanted slightly rightwards.

To look at it another way, channel A sees the channel B data stretched out in time, hence the technique has a low-pass effect on noise intruding from another channel.

Every videotape system was designed to put as much video as possible onto a given-sized tape, but information from one recording track (pass of the video head) must not interfere with information on adjacent stripes. Using slant azimuth recording, the need for guard bands, that is the blank space between tracks, is eliminated, allowing more recording to be placed on a given length of tape. 

All the early low-end reel-to-reel VTR machines and the first VCR cassette formats, the Philips and the Sony U-matic, used this system.  Later, the JVC VHS and the Sony Betamax used slant azimuth recording also.  These digital VTR versions used azimuth recording as well.

See also 
Symmetric Phase Recording
VTR
Tape head
Helical scan
Slant azimuth recording
Betamax

References
mrbetamax.com Mr. betamax, Helical Azimuth Recording
Canon Video Recording System Two rotating head, helical scan azimuth recording.
The Art of Digital Video,  By John Watkinson, page 570
Video engineering,  By Arch C. Luther, Andrew F. Inglis, page 302.
Google Patents, Magnetic head for azimuth recording in a high density magnetic recording system, Ken Takahashi et al.
Society of Motion Picture and Television Engineers The Videotape Recorder: Its Evolution and the Present State of the Art of VTR Technology, by Hiroshi Sugaya1, September 17, 1985.

Computer storage tape media